The 2017 Red Bull Air Race of Abu Dhabi was the first round of the 2017 Red Bull Air Race World Championship, the twelfth season of the Red Bull Air Race World Championship. The event was held in Zayed Port, Abu Dhabi - the capital city of the United Arab Emirates.

Master Class

Qualification

Round of 14

 Pilot received 2 seconds in penalties

 Pilot received 3 seconds in penalties

Round of 8

Final 4

Challenger Class

Results

Standings after the event

Master Class standings

Challenger Class standings

 Note: Only the top five positions are included for both sets of standings.

References

External links

|- style="text-align:center"
|width="35%"|Previous race:2016 Red Bull Air Race of Las Vegas
|width="30%"|Red Bull Air Race2017 season
|width="35%"|Next race:2017 Red Bull Air Race of San Diego
|- style="text-align:center"
|width="35%"|Previous race:2016 Red Bull Air Race of Abu Dhabi
|width="30%"|Red Bull Air Race of Abu Dhabi
|width="35%"|Next race:2018 Red Bull Air Race of Abu Dhabi
|- style="text-align:center"

Abu Dhabi
Red Bull Air Race World Championship
Red Bull Air Race World Championship